The Grammy Award for Best Musical Album for Children was an honor presented to recording artists for quality  children's music albums at the Grammy Awards, a ceremony that was established in 1958 and originally called the Gramophone Awards. Honors in several categories are presented at the ceremony annually by the National Academy of Recording Arts and Sciences of the United States to "honor artistic achievement, technical proficiency and overall excellence in the recording industry, without regard to album sales or chart position".

The award for Best Musical Album for Children was first presented to producer Alan Menken and Tim Rice in 1994 for the soundtrack to the Disney film Aladdin.

The award was discontinued from 2012 in a major overhaul of Grammy categories. Starting in 2012, this category merged with the Best Spoken Word Album for Children category to form the new Best Children's Album category. This merger meant essentially returning to the categorization set-up prior to 1994 (although with a small name change), when recordings for children was covered by the Grammy Award for Best Album for Children alone.

Recipients

 Each year is linked to the article about the Grammy Awards held that year.
 Producer(s) are only indicated if they were presented a Grammy Award.

See also
 Children's song
 Juno Award for Children's Album of the Year

References

General
 

Specific

 
1994 establishments in the United States
Album awards
Awards established in 1994
Awards disestablished in 2011
Children's music albums
Musical Album for Children